Crepidacantha is a genus of bryozoans belonging to the family Crepidacanthidae.

The genus has cosmopolitan distribution.

Species:

Crepidacantha anakenensis 
Crepidacantha bracebridgei 
Crepidacantha carsioseta 
Crepidacantha craticula 
Crepidacantha crinispina 
Crepidacantha grandis 
Crepidacantha kirkpatricki 
Crepidacantha longiseta 
Crepidacantha odontostoma 
Crepidacantha parvipora 
Crepidacantha poissonii 
Crepidacantha setigera 
Crepidacantha solea 
Crepidacantha teres 
Crepidacantha zelanica

References

Bryozoan genera